Duke of Sussex is a substantive title, one of several royal dukedoms, that has been created twice in the Peerage of the United Kingdom. It is a hereditary title of a specific rank of nobility in the British royal family. It takes its name from the historic county of Sussex in England.

The title lapsed in 1843 but was revived in 2018, when Queen Elizabeth II bestowed it on her grandson Prince Harry on 19 May 2018 upon his marriage to Meghan Markle, who became  the Duchess of Sussex.

History
A title associated with Sussex first appeared with the Kingdom of Sussex, an Anglo-Saxon kingdom that was annexed by the Kingdom of Wessex around 827, that later became part of the Kingdom of England. In charters, Sussex's monarchs were sometimes referred to as ealdormen, or duces in Latin, which is sometimes translated as "dukes".

First creation, 1801
The title of Duke of Sussex was first conferred on 24 November 1801 upon Prince Augustus Frederick, the sixth son of King George III. He was made Baron Arklow and Earl of Inverness at the same time, also in the Peerage of the United Kingdom. The title became extinct upon Prince Augustus Frederick's death in 1843.

Although Prince Augustus Frederick was survived by a son and daughter by Lady Augusta Murray, their marriage (purportedly solemnized at St George's Hanover Square Church, Westminster, in 1793) had been annulled for lack of royal permission under the Royal Marriages Act 1772, rendering the children illegitimate under English law and unable to inherit titles from their father. Both children by the annulled marriage died childless, rendering the issue of their inheritance moot.

On 2 May 1831, Prince Augustus Frederick married secondly (and again in contravention of the Royal Marriages Act 1772) to Lady Cecilia Gore at Great Cumberland Place, London. Not being the Prince's legitimate wife, Lady Cecilia could not be received at court. On 30 March 1840, she was given the title of Duchess of Inverness in her own right by Queen Victoria.

Second creation, 2018
In 2018, the dukedom of Sussex was recreated and granted to Prince Harry, the grandson of Queen Elizabeth II and great-great-great-great-great grandnephew of the previous Duke, to mark the occasion of his wedding to Meghan Markle, who thereby became the first ever Duchess of Sussex. On 19 May 2018, it was announced that Prince Harry would become Duke of Sussex in England, with the subsidiary titles of Earl of Dumbarton in Scotland and Baron Kilkeel in Northern Ireland. In 2019, an heir to the dukedom, Archie Mountbatten-Windsor, was born.

In 1999, before the wedding of Prince Edward, the youngest son of Queen Elizabeth II, some had suggested the dukedoms of Sussex or Cambridge as the most likely titles to be granted to him. Instead, Prince Edward was created Earl of Wessex, and it was announced that he would eventually be created Duke of Edinburgh, a title then held by his father, Prince Philip. It was reported in 2021 that Prince Charles had decided not to give the title to his brother upon accession to the monarchy; Clarence House stated that no decision had been taken.

There was again speculation that Prince William might be given the Sussex title on his wedding to Catherine Middleton in April 2011, but he was instead created Duke of Cambridge.

Dukes of Sussex

1801 creation

| Prince Augustus FrederickHouse of Hanover1801–1843 
| 
| 27 January 1773Buckingham House, Londonson of King George III and Queen Charlotte
| 4 April 1793Lady Augusta Murray2 children2 May 1831Lady Cecilia UnderwoodNo children
| 21 April 1843Kensington Palace, Londonaged 70

|}

Prince Augustus's first marriage to Lady Augusta Murray, which produced two children, was invalid under the Royal Marriages Act 1772 (he had not asked his father's approval to marry); so, accordingly, all his titles became extinct on his death.

2018 creation

| Prince HarryHouse of Windsor2018–presentalso: Earl of Dumbarton and Baron Kilkeel (2018)
| 
| 15 September 1984St Mary's Hospital, Londonson of King Charles III and Diana, Princess of Wales
| 19 May 2018Meghan Markle2 children
| Incumbent
|-
|}

Line of succession

 Prince Harry, Duke of Sussex (born 1984)
 (1) Prince Archie of Sussex (born 2019)

Family tree

See also
 Earl of Sussex

References

 
Dukedoms in the Peerage of the United Kingdom
Noble titles created in 2018
Noble titles created in 1801
Prince Harry, Duke of Sussex